The 1932 United States presidential election in New Mexico took place on November 8, 1932. All contemporary forty-eight states were part of the 1932 United States presidential election. State voters chose three electors to represent them in the Electoral College, which voted for President and Vice President.

New Mexico was won by New York Governor Franklin D. Roosevelt in a 27-point landslide against incumbent president Herbert Hoover, who failed to gain reelection. He won every county save Valencia and San Miguel.

Results

Results by county

References

New Mexico
1932 New Mexico elections
1932